Born in Puerto Rico, Benjamin Noriega-Ortiz spent his childhood between the capital's suburban area of Guaynabo and Luquillo Beach, where his parents had an apartment. After attending Margarita Janer High School in Guaynabo, he studied in the School of Architecture at the University of Puerto Rico.

Career
Noriega-Ortiz completed his first master's degree in Architecture at the University of Puerto Rico in 1982.  He moved to New York, where he earned a second master's degree in Architecture and Urban Design from Columbia University. Noriega-Ortiz started his career at the interior and product design studio of John F. Saladino, Inc. where he spent nine years, including six as head interior designer. He established his own firm, Benjamin Noriega-Ortiz, LLC in 1992.  Benjamin was named one of New York Spaces' top 50 designers. He was also named one of the top 10 designers by House Beautiful. He is ranked by Mate in its 2012 list of 500 Power Gays in the world.

References 

1956 births
Columbia Graduate School of Architecture, Planning and Preservation alumni
Puerto Rican architects
People from Guaynabo, Puerto Rico
Living people
Puerto Rican LGBT people
University of Puerto Rico alumni
Urban designers
21st-century LGBT people